Stegana coleoptrata  is a species of fly in the family Drosophilidae. It is found in the  Palearctic .

References

External links
Images representing Stegana coleoptrata  at BOLD

Drosophilidae
Insects described in 1763
Muscomorph flies of Europe
Taxa named by Giovanni Antonio Scopoli